Kunlong District was a district of the Shan State in Myanmar. It was dissolved in November 2014. It consists of 2 towns and 458 villages.

Townships
The district contained the following townships:

Kunlong Township
Hopang Township

Hopang Township became part of Hopang District and is now not anymore under Kunlong District since September 2011. Now Kunlong District just consists of Kunlong Township

References

Districts of Myanmar
Geography of Shan State